Maurice Gallaga (August 25, 1943 – May 7, 2020), better known as Peque Gallaga, was a multi-awarded Filipino film-maker. His most significant achievement in film was Oro, Plata, Mata, which he directed after winning a scriptwriting contest sponsored by the Experimental Cinema of the Philippines. He has received an award from the International Film Festival of Flanders-Ghent, Belgium in 1983; a Special Jury Award from the Manila International Film Festival; and the 2004 Gawad CCP para sa Sining.

Education
Gallaga spent his elementary and high school years at De La Salle University in City of Manila, then finished his bachelor's in commerce and liberal arts at the University of St. La Salle in Bacolod City, Negros Occidental Province, Visayas. He taught theater and film at the University of St. La Salle.

Career

Rise to prominence
Upon moving back to Manila, he got involved in television musicals and eventually co-directed the film Binhi with Butch Perez. He also directed the movies Virgin Forest, Scorpio Nights, Unfaithful Wife, and the "Manananggal" segment of Shake, Rattle & Roll.

In 1986 he started co-directing films with Lore Reyes, with whom he shared directing credits for Shake, Rattle & Roll II, Shake, Rattle & Roll III, Shake, Rattle & Roll IV, Baby Love, and more than twenty other films. In the animated movie Dayo, Gallaga voiced the character of "Lolo Nano," the resident sage of Elementalia.

Gallaga and Laida Lim-Pérez won Best Production Design for Eddie Romero's Ganito Kami Noon, Paano Kayo Ngayon? in the first 1976 of Gawad Urian awards.

In 1980, he won the same award for Ishmael Bernal's City After Dark.

During the 1980s, Gallaga served as member of the Film Academy Classification Board (FACB).

In 1989, Gallaga was forced to shelve the film Huwad Na Heredera during production when its lead actress Lorna Tolentino became pregnant; it was later repurposed into a segment for the anthology film True Confessions in 1992, where it was retitled "Evelyn".

Gallaga and Reyes won Best Director and Best Screenplay for Magic Temple in the 1996 Metro Manila Film Festival.

Later career
In 2009, Agaton & Mindy, directed by Gallaga, was released in theaters.

In 2013, saw the release of several of Gallaga's directorial efforts. On his own these include the film Sonata, and the documentary Botong Francisco: A Nation Imagined. With Reyes they directed Seduction. Also that year, Gallaga was interviewed in the documentary The Search for Weng Weng.

In 2014, Gallaga and Reyes collaborated on their final motion picture T'yanak.

Personal life
Gallaga lived with his wife Madie in Bacolod. They were married for 52 years. They have five children: Gines, Michelle, Datu, Jubal and Wanggo.

Death
Gallaga was hospitalized in Bacolod City on May 5, 2020, due to complications from his past health conditions. Two days later on May 7, Gallaga died in hospital from cardio-pulmonary arrest.

He was cremated in accordance to him and his family's wishes.

Partial filmography

Director
Binhi (1973)
Oro, Plata, Mata (1982)
Bad Bananas sa Puting Tabing (1983)
Shake, Rattle & Roll ("Manananggal" segment; 1984)
Scorpio Nights (1985)
Virgin Forest (1985)
Unfaithful Wife (1986)
Once Upon a Time (with Lorenzo A. Reyes, 1987)
Kid, Huwag Kang Susuko (with Lorenzo A. Reyes, 1987)
Hiwaga sa Balete Drive (with Lorenzo A. Reyes, 1988)
Tiyanak (with Lorenzo A. Reyes, 1988)

Isang Araw Walang Diyos (with Lorenzo A. Reyes, 1989)
Abandonada (with Lorenzo A. Reyes, 1989)
Trese (1990)
Shake, Rattle & Roll II (with Lore Reyes, 1990)
Adventures of Gary Leon at Kuting (1991)
Shake, Rattle & Roll III (1991)
True Confessions ("Evelyn" segment; 1992) 
Aswang (1992) 
Shake, Rattle & Roll IV ("Ang Guro" segment; 1992) 
Dugo ng Panday (1993) 
Mars Ravelo's Darna! Ang Pagbabalik (1994) 
Batang X (1995)
Baby Love (1995)
Magic Temple (1996)
Magic Kingdom (Alamat ng Damortis) (1997)
Halik ng Bampira (1997)
Diliryo (1997)
Gangland (1998)
Puso ng Pasko (1998)
Ang Kabit ni Mrs. Montero (1999)
Unfaithful Wife 2: Sana'y Huwag Akong Maligaw (1999)
Sa Piling ng Aswang (with Lore Reyes, 1999)
Pinoy Blonde (2005)
Agaton & Mindy (2009)
Seduction (2013)
Sonata (with Lore Reyes, 2013)
T'yanak (with Lore Reyes, 2014)

Screenwriter
Once Upon a Time (1986)
Hiwaga sa Balete Drive (1988)
Tiyanak (with Lorenzo Reyes, 1988)
Isang Araw Walang Diyos (1989) (story and screenplay)
Shake, Rattle & Roll II (1990)
Aswang (1992)
Shake, Rattle & Roll IV (1992)
Dugo ng Panday (1993)
Baby Love (1995) (story and screenplay)
Magic Temple (1996) (screenplay)
Magic Kingdom (Alamat ng damortis) (1997)
Scorpio Nights 2 (1999) (story)
Ang Agimat, anting-anting ni Lolo (2002) (screenplay)
Pinoy Blonde (2005)

Actor
Tatlong Taong Walang Diyos (1976) - Francis
Lucio & Miguel (1992) – San Pedro
José Rizal (1998) – Archbishop Bernardo Nozaleda, OP
Tigasin (1999)
The Cory Quirino Kidnap: NBI Files (2003)
Enteng Kabisote 4 (2007) – Time Lord
Dayo (2008) – Lolo Nano
Namets! (2008) – Boss Dolpo
Si Agimat at si Enteng Kabisote (2010) – Ermitanyo
Pak! Pak! My Dr. Kwak! (2011) – San Pedro
ISLANDS (2013)
Woman of the Ruins (2013)

Awards

References

External links

1943 births
2020 deaths
Filipino film directors
Filipino television directors
People from Bacolod
Artists from Negros Occidental
Filipino people of Spanish descent
University of St. La Salle alumni
Visayan people